This article contains all results of the handball team HT Tatran Prešov in European competitions.

Competitions
Q = Qualifying
R1 = First round
R2 = Second round
R3 = Third round
L16 = Last 16
QF = Quarter-final
SF = Semi-final
F = Final
B = Bronze medal match 
G-X = Group stage, Group X

HT Tatran Prešov